Herrick Smith "Spoke" Emery (December 10, 1898 – June 2, 1975) was a Major League Baseball outfielder.

He played five games in the major leagues, with two career hits in three at-bats. After the end of his brief career in the majors, he remained active in the minor leagues, as a player-manager. Emery played for and managed the Class D Cotton States League's Meridian Mets from 1926 until the middle of 1927. He also played and managed for the Class D Mississippi Valley League's Cedar Rapids Bunnies in 1927 and 1928, then moved on to the Class D Eastern Carolina League's Goldsboro Goldbugs in 1929, playing and managing there as well. This marked the end of Emery's playing career, but he remained active as a manager for one more season, spending 1930 as the skipper of the Class C Ontario League's Brantford Red Sox.

Emery died on June 2, 1975 in Cape Canaveral, Florida.

External links

1898 births
1975 deaths
Sportspeople from Bay City, Michigan
Philadelphia Phillies players
Major League Baseball outfielders
Baseball players from Michigan
Minor league baseball managers
Saginaw Aces players
London Tecumsehs (baseball) players
Moline Plowboys players
Birmingham Barons players
Nashville Vols players
Memphis Chickasaws players
New Orleans Pelicans (baseball) players
Mobile Bears players
People from Cape Canaveral, Florida